The president of the Polytechnic University of the Philippines is the principal executive officer of the Polytechnic University of the Philippines. The president oversees the policy implementation, guide the institution towards the realization of its vision-mission, as well as monitor and administer the overall affairs of the university, and is the vice-chairman of its Board of Regents. Republic Act No. 8292, formed in 1996, establishes the powers, and appointment of the President of the Polytechnic University of the Philippines.

Manuel Muhi, is the 13th and current president of the Polytechnic University of the Philippines. He assumed office on March 17, 2020 and officially sworn as president on October 1, 2021 due to prompt declaration of lockdown in Luzon last year.

List of past presidents 

Notes
 Names in italics serves as acting presidents or officer-in-charge</onlyinclude>

See also 

 Polytechnic University of the Philippines

References

External links 

 Polytechnic University of the Philippines

Polytechnic University of the Philippines
Presidents of universities and colleges in the Philippines